The 2016 Bonnaroo Music Festival was held June 9-12, 2016 in Manchester, Tennessee. This marked the 15th consecutive festival since its inception in 2002. Bonnaroo saw its lowest attendance to date in 2016 with 45,537 tickets sold. A 38 percent decrease from the previous year

The line-up was announced January 19, 2016 by American television host, Conan O'Brien on his late night show Conan.

Line-up

Thursday, June 9 
(artists listed from earliest to latest set times)

 This Tent:
LANY
Waxahatchee
Bully
Twin Peaks
Børns
 The Floozies
 That Tent:
Con Brio
The London Souls
 Papadosio
Hermitude
Lizzo
Cashmere Cat
 The Other Tent
Roman Gianarthur
Lolawolf
Hundred Waters
Vulfpeck
Marian Hill
Goldlink
 Comedy Theatre presented by TBS
 Joyelle Nicole
Aparna Nancherla
John Early
Rachel Feinstein
Nate Bargatze
 Ian Abramson
Jon Gabrus
Bridget Everett
Piff the Magic Dragon
 Josh Adam Meyer
Matteo Lane
John Early
Sean Patton
 New Music on Tap Lounge brewed by Miller Lite:
 Roots of a Rebellion
 Quaildogs
 Lael Neale
Polyenso
 Mail the Horse
 Communion Stage
Doe Paoro
Joseph 
Hinds
Wet
 Silent Disco
 Full Service Party
 Quickie Mart
 DJ Uncle Jesse
 Snake and Jake's Christmas Club Barn
 Tiki Disco
 New Breed Brass Band
 Full Service Party
 Gypsyphonik Disco

Friday, June 10 

 What Stage
Allen Stone
Misterwives
CHVRCHES
J. Cole
LCD Soundsystem
 Which Stage
Andra Day
St. Lucia
Griz
Halsey
M83
Tame Impala
 This Tent
Rayland Baxter
Ibeyi
Kamasi Washington
Vince Staples
Tyler the Creator
The Chainsmokers
Zeds Dead
 That Tent
Jarryd James
Daughter
Fidlar
Keys N Krates
Flosstradamus
Bryson Tiller
Bob Moses
 The Other Tent
Dungen
Brett Dennen
Shamir
Lucius
Leon Bridges
Purity Ring
Blood Orange
 Comedy Theatre presented by TBS
Sam Jay
Alice Wetterlund
Jak Knight
Adam Ray
Bridget Everett
Piff the Magic Dragon
 Josh Adam Meyer
Matteo Lane
John Early
 New Music on Tap Lounge brewed by Miller Lite
 Stokeswood
 Firekid
Luke Bell
Amanda Shires
Andrew Combs
 Zach Heckendorf
 Who Stage
Henry Wagons
Mothers
 Public Access TV
Whitney
Arkells
Holy White Hounds
 Flux Capacitor
 Powers
 Silent Disco
 DJ Uncle Jesse
 Tiki Disco
DJ Logic
 DJ Prince Hakim
 Quickie Mart
Lane 8
 Snake and Jake's Christmas Club Barn
 Full Service Party
 New Breed Brass Band
Stretch Armstrong
 Tiki Disco
 Tropical Party

Saturday, June 11 

 What Stage
Grace Potter
Chris Stapleton
Band of Horses
Macklemore and Ryan Lewis
Pearl Jam
 Which Stage
Chicano Batman
Judah and the Lion
Two Door Cinema Club
Haim
Ellie Goulding
 This Tent
Anderson East
The Internet
Steve Gunn
Nathaniel Rateliff and the Night Sweats
Sam Hunt
 Superjam
 That Tent
Natalie Prass
Beach Fossils
Oh Wonder
The Claypool Lennon Delirium
Miguel
Big Grams (Big Boi + Phantogram)
 The Other Tent
 Whilk and Misky
The Knocks
Post Malone
Clutch
Lamb of God
RL Grime
Adventure Club
 Comedy Theatre presented by TBS
Alice Wetterlund
Same Jay
 Jak Knight
Adam Ray
Sean Patton
 Josh Adam Meyer
Matteo Lane
Bridget Everett
Judd Apatow
Vanessa Bayer
Pete Davidson
Beth Stelling
Nate Bargatze
 New Music on Tap Lounge brewed by Miller Lite
 Joe Hertler and the Rainbow Seekers
 Lawrence
The Record Company
 Grandma Sparrow
Isaac Gracie
Cardiknox
 Who Stage
Dylan LeBlanc
Margaret Glaspy
Amasa Hines
Grace Mitchell
Aubrie Sellers
 Promised Land Sound
Sir the Baptist
 Silent Disco
 E.Feld
DJ Logic
 NSR
Jonathan Toubin
Red Bull Music Academy Takeover
 Snake and Jake's Christmas Club Barn
 Full Service Party
 Throwback Alt Rock Party
 Robe Rage
 90's Rave

Sunday, June 12 

 What Stage
Charles Bradley and the Extraordinaires
Jason Isbell
Death Cab for Cutie
Dead and Company (2 sets)
 Which Stage
Cymande
Kurt Vile and the Violators
Father John Misty
Ween
 This Tent
Civil Twilight
Boy and Bear
Saint Motel
Lettuce
Lord Huron
 That Tent
John Moreland
Sara Watkins
The Wood Brothers
Steep Canyon Rangers
 Sam Bush Band
 The Bluegrass Situation Superjam featuring Ed Helms and Friends
 The Other Tent
 Givers
The Oh Hellos
X Ambassadors
Third Eye Blind
 Comedy Theatre presented by TBS
Sam Jay
Alice Wetterlund
 Jak Knight
Adam Ray
Adam Devine
 Josh Rabinowitz
 New Music on Tap Lounge brewed by Miller Lite
 The Pinklets
 Korey Dane
Finish Ticket
Polly A.
 Who Stage
 Austin Plaine
Sun Club
Maren Morris
Sunflower Bean
Swim Deep
 DAWN
 Silent Disco 
 NSR
 Snake and Jake's Christmas Club Barn
 Full Service Party
 Classic Hip Hop Party
 Dance Hall Reggae

References

External links 
Official Bonnaroo site

Bonnaroo Music Festival by year
2016 music festivals